The Sony Zeiss Vario-Tessar T* FE 24-70mm F4 ZA OSS is a constant maximum aperture full-frame (FE) zoom lens for the Sony E-mount, announced by Sony on October 16, 2013.

Though designed for Sony's full frame E-mount cameras, the lens can be used on Sony's APS-C E-mount camera bodies, with an equivalent full-frame field-of-view of 36-105mm.

Build quality
The lens showcases a minimalist black weather resistant metal exterior with a Zeiss badge on the side of the barrel and no zoom lock to prevent zoom creep. Both the zoom and focus rings are metal. The barrel of the lens telescopes outward from the main lens body as it's zoomed in from 24mm to 70mm.

See also
List of Sony E-mount lenses
Sony FE 24-70mm F2.8 GM
Zeiss Vario-Tessar

References

Camera lenses introduced in 2013
24-70
24-70